Muhammad Ahmed Khan Kasuri (1922–1974) was a Pakistani man assassinated in 1974 in a car ambush targeting his son. Ahmad Raza Khan Kasuri, a critic of the country's prime minister, escaped the ambush. The attack was allegedly on the orders of Pakistani Prime Minister Zulfiqar Ali Bhutto.

Zulfiqar Ali Bhutto was later arrested and convicted in 1976 by the Lahore High Court.

References

1922 births
1974 deaths

Assassinated Pakistani people
Zulfikar Ali Bhutto